Michael Madhu (1969/70-May 13, 2020) was an Indian actor in the Kannada film industry. Some of the notable films of Michael Madhu as an actor include Bhajarangi (2013), Shhh! (1993), and Ashwamedha (1990).

Career 
Michael Madhu was part of more than three hundred films.

Death
Michael Madhu died due to complications from a heart attack, on 13 May 2020.

Selected filmography 

 Shhh! (1993)
 Operation Antha (1995)
 Om (1995)
 Minugu Thare (1996)
 Gajanura Gandu (1996)
 Suprabhatha (1988)
 Ee Hrudaya Ninagagi (1997)
 Yamalokadalli Veerappan (1998)
 A (1998)
 Meese Hottha Gandasige Demandappo Demandu (1999)
 AK 47 (1999) [Kannada and Telugu Bi-lingual]
 Papigala Lokadalli (2000)
 Vaalee (2001)
 Neelambari (2001)
 Surya Vamsha (1999)
 Bhajarangi (2013)
 Uppi 2 (2015)
 French Biriyani (2020)

See also 

 List of people from Karnataka
 Cinema of Karnataka
 List of Indian film actors
 Cinema of India

References 

Male actors in Kannada cinema
Indian male film actors
Male actors from Karnataka
20th-century Indian male actors
21st-century Indian male actors
2020 deaths
Year of birth missing